Errol Spence Jr. vs. Shawn Porter was a professional boxing welterweight championship unification match contested between IBF champion Errol Spence Jr. and WBC champion Shawn Porter. The event took place on September 28, 2019 at the Staples Center in Los Angeles, California. Spence Jr. won the fight via split decision, with two scorecards reading 116–111 for Spence Jr., and the third 115–112 for Porter.

The fight
Spence Jr. and Porter participated in a frenetic encounter from start to finish, with one CBS analyst declaring it a "fight of the year candidate". Porter started fast, sometimes overwhelming Spence Jr. in the early rounds. Spence Jr., however, began attacking Porter's body and was able to slowly gain a slight edge on the judges' scorecards. With the fight still close, Spence Jr. landed a short left hook to Porter's chin in round eleven, causing Porter's glove to touch the canvas and scoring the only knockdown of the fight. Porter remained on his feet and received an eight-count by referee Jack Reiss before resuming the contest, finishing the round, and engaging in an action-packed twelfth and final round.

In the end, Spence Jr. was given a split decision win on the official scorecards, with Filipino judge Rey Danseco and Steve Weisfeld had it 116–111 for him and Larry Hazzard Jr tallied 115–112 for Porter. Spence Jr. won Porter's WBC title and successfully defended his IBF title for the fourth time.

Television
The fight was telecast on Fox Sports pay per view in the United States, Sky Sports in the United Kingdom and via FITE TV on pay per view outside of North America.

Fight card

See also
Felix Trinidad vs. Oscar De La Hoya, another Welterweight unification fight pitting an IBF champion (Trinidad) against a WBC one (De La Hoya), a bit over 20 years to this fight's date.

References

Boxing matches
Boxing in Los Angeles
2019 in boxing
September 2019 sports events in the United States
2019 in sports in California
Sports competitions in Los Angeles
2019 in Los Angeles
Events in Los Angeles